The mineral pyrite, or iron pyrite, also known as fool's gold, is an iron sulfide with the chemical formula FeS2 (iron (II) disulfide). Pyrite is the most abundant sulfide mineral.

Pyrite's metallic luster and pale brass-yellow hue give it a superficial resemblance to gold, hence the well-known nickname of fool's gold. The color has also led to the nicknames brass, brazzle, and Brazil, primarily used to refer to pyrite found in coal.

In ancient Roman times, this name was applied to several types of stone that would create sparks when struck against steel; Pliny the Elder described one of them as being brassy, almost certainly a reference to what we now call pyrite.

By Georgius Agricola's time, the term had become a generic term for all of the sulfide minerals.

Pyrite is usually found associated with other sulfides or oxides in quartz veins, sedimentary rock, and metamorphic rock, as well as in coal beds and as a replacement mineral in fossils, but has also been identified in the sclerites of scaly-foot gastropods. Despite being nicknamed "fool's gold", pyrite is sometimes found in association with small quantities of gold. A substantial proportion of the gold is "invisible gold" incorporated into the pyrite (see Carlin-type gold deposit). It has been suggested that the presence of both gold and arsenic is a case of coupled substitution but as of 1997 the chemical state of the gold remained controversial.

Uses 

Pyrite enjoyed brief popularity in the 16th and 17th centuries as a source of ignition in early firearms, most notably the wheellock, where a sample of pyrite was placed against a circular file to strike the sparks needed to fire the gun.

Pyrite is used with flintstone and a form of tinder made of stringybark by the Kaurna people, people of South Australia, as a traditional method of starting fires.

Pyrite has been used since classical times to manufacture copperas (ferrous sulfate). Iron pyrite was heaped up and allowed to weather (an example of an early form of heap leaching). The acidic runoff from the heap was then boiled with iron to produce iron sulfate. In the 15th century, new methods of such leaching began to replace the burning of sulfur as a source of sulfuric acid. By the 19th century, it had become the dominant method.

Pyrite remains in commercial use for the production of sulfur dioxide, for use in such applications as the paper industry, and in the manufacture of sulfuric acid.

A newer commercial use for pyrite is as the cathode material in Energizer brand non-rechargeable lithium metal batteries.

Pyrite is a semiconductor material with a band gap of 0.95 eV. Pure pyrite is naturally n-type, in both crystal and thin-film forms, potentially due to sulfur vacancies in the pyrite crystal structure acting as n-dopants.

During the early years of the 20th century, pyrite was used as a mineral detector in radio receivers, and is still used by crystal radio hobbyists. Until the vacuum tube matured, the crystal detector was the most sensitive and dependable detector available—with considerable variation between mineral types and even individual samples within a particular type of mineral. Pyrite detectors occupied a midway point between galena detectors and the more mechanically complicated perikon mineral pairs. Pyrite detectors can be as sensitive as a modern 1N34A germanium diode detector.

Pyrite has been proposed as an abundant, non-toxic, inexpensive material in low-cost photovoltaic solar panels. Synthetic iron sulfide was used with copper sulfide to create the photovoltaic material. More recent efforts are working toward thin-film solar cells made entirely of pyrite.

Pyrite is used to make marcasite jewelry. Marcasite jewelry, made from small faceted pieces of pyrite, often set in silver, was known since ancient times and was popular in the Victorian era. At the time when the term became common in jewelry making, "marcasite" referred to all iron sulfides including pyrite, and not to the orthorhombic FeS2 mineral marcasite which is lighter in color, brittle and chemically unstable, and thus not suitable for jewelry making. Marcasite jewelry does not actually contain the mineral marcasite. The specimens of pyrite, when it appears as good quality crystals, are used in decoration. They are also very popular in mineral collecting. Among the sites that provide the best specimens are Soria and La Rioja provinces (Spain).

In value terms, China ($47 million) constitutes the largest market for imported unroasted iron pyrites worldwide, making up 65% of global imports. China is also the fastest growing in terms of the unroasted iron pyrites imports, with a CAGR of +27.8% from 2007 to 2016.

Research
In July 2020 scientists reported that they have observed a voltage-induced transformation of normally diamagnetic pyrite into a ferromagnetic material, which may lead to applications in devices such as solar cells or magnetic data storage.
Researchers at Trinity College Dublin, Ireland have demonstrated that FeS2 can be exfoliated into few-layers just like other two-dimensional layered materials such as graphene by a simple liquid-phase exfoliation route. This is the first study to demonstrate the production of non-layered 2D-platelets from 3D bulk FeS2. Furthermore, they have used these 2D-platelets with 20% single walled carbon-nanotube as an anode material in lithium-ion batteries, reaching a capacity of 1000 mAh/g close to the theoretical capacity of FeS2.
In 2021,a natural pyrite stone has been crushed and pre-treated followed by liquid-phase exfoliation into two-dimensional nanosheets, which has shown capacities of 1200 mAh/g as an anode in lithium-ion batteries.

Formal oxidation states for pyrite, marcasite, molybdenite and arsenopyrite

From the perspective of classical inorganic chemistry, which assigns formal oxidation states to each atom, pyrite and marcasite are probably best described as Fe2+[S2]2−. This formalism recognizes that the sulfur atoms in pyrite occur in pairs with clear S–S bonds. These persulfide [–S–S–] units can be viewed as derived from hydrogen disulfide, H2S2. Thus pyrite would be more descriptively called iron persulfide, not iron disulfide. In contrast, molybdenite, MoS2, features isolated sulfide S2− centers and the oxidation state of molybdenum is Mo4+. The mineral arsenopyrite has the formula FeAsS. Whereas pyrite has [S2]2– units, arsenopyrite has [AsS]3– units, formally derived from deprotonation of arsenothiol (H2AsSH). Analysis of classical oxidation states would recommend the description of arsenopyrite as Fe3+[AsS]3−.

Crystallography

Iron-pyrite FeS2 represents the prototype compound of the crystallographic pyrite structure. The structure is simple cubic and was among the first crystal structures solved by X-ray diffraction. It belongs to the crystallographic space group Pa and is denoted by the Strukturbericht notation C2. The unit cell is composed of a Fe face-centered cubic sublattice into which the  ions are embedded. (Note though that the iron atoms in the faces are not equivalent by translation alone to the iron atoms at the corners.) The pyrite structure is also seen in other MX2 compounds of transition metals M and chalcogens X = O, S, Se and Te. Certain dipnictides with X standing for P, As and Sb etc. are also known to adopt the pyrite structure.

The Fe atoms are bonded to six S atoms, giving a distorted octahedron. The material is a semiconductor. The Fe ions is usually considered to be low spin divalent state (as shown by Mössbauer spectroscopy as well as XPS). The material as a whole behaves as a Van Vleck paramagnet, despite its low-spin divalency.

The sulfur centers occur in pairs, described as S22−. Reduction of pyrite with potassium gives potassium dithioferrate, KFeS2.  This material features ferric ions and isolated sulfide (S2-) centers.

The S atoms are tetrahedral, being bonded to three Fe centers and one other S atom. The site symmetry at Fe and S positions is accounted for by point symmetry groups C3i and C3, respectively. The missing center of inversion at S lattice sites has important consequences for the crystallographic and physical properties of iron pyrite. These consequences derive from the crystal electric field active at the sulfur lattice site, which causes a polarisation of S ions in the pyrite lattice. The polarisation can be calculated on the basis of higher-order Madelung constants and has to be included in the calculation of the lattice energy by using a generalised Born–Haber cycle. This reflects the fact that the covalent bond in the sulfur pair is inadequately accounted for by a strictly ionic treatment.

Arsenopyrite has a related structure with heteroatomic As–S pairs rather than S-S pairs. Marcasite also possesses homoatomic anion pairs, but the arrangement of the metal and diatomic anions differ from that of pyrite. Despite its name, chalcopyrite does not contain dianion pairs, but single S2− sulfide anions.

Crystal habit

Pyrite usually forms cuboid crystals, sometimes forming in close association to form raspberry-shaped masses called framboids. However, under certain circumstances, it can form anastomosing filaments or T-shaped crystals.
Pyrite can also form shapes almost the same as a regular dodecahedron, known as pyritohedra, and this suggests an explanation for the artificial geometrical models found in Europe as early as the 5th century BC.

Varieties
Cattierite (CoS2), vaesite (NiS2) and hauerite (MnS2), as well as sperrylite (PtAs2) are similar in their structure and belong also to the pyrite group.

 is a nickel-cobalt bearing variety of pyrite, with > 50% substitution of Ni2+ for Fe2+ within pyrite. Bravoite is not a formally recognised mineral, and is named after the Peruvian scientist Jose J. Bravo (1874–1928).

Distinguishing similar minerals
Pyrite is distinguishable from native gold by its hardness, brittleness and crystal form. Pyrite fractures are very uneven, sometimes conchoidal because it does not cleave along a preferential plane. Native gold nuggets, or glitters, do not break but deform in a ductile way. Pyrite is brittle, gold is malleable.

Natural gold tends to be anhedral (irregularly shaped without well defined faces), whereas pyrite comes as either cubes or multifaceted crystals with well developed and sharp faces easy to recognise. Well crystallised pyrite crystals are euhedral (i.e., with nice faces). Pyrite can often be distinguished by the striations which, in many cases, can be seen on its surface. Chalcopyrite is brighter yellow with a greenish hue when wet and is softer (3.5–4 on Mohs' scale). Arsenopyrite (FeAsS) is silver white and does not become more yellow when wet.

Hazards

Iron pyrite is unstable when exposed to the oxidizing conditions prevailing at the Earth's surface: iron pyrite in contact with atmospheric oxygen and water, or damp, ultimately decomposes into iron oxyhydroxides (ferrihydrite, FeO(OH)) and sulfuric acid. This process is accelerated by the action of Acidithiobacillus bacteria which oxidize pyrite to first produce ferrous ions, sulfate ions, and release protons (or ). In a second step, the ferrous ions are oxidized by  into ferric ions which hydrolyze also releasing  ions and producing FeO(OH). These oxidation reactions occur more rapidly when pyrite is finely dispersed (framboidal crystals initially formed by sulfate reducing bacteria (SRB) in argillaceous sediments or dust from mining operations).

Pyrite oxidation and acid mine drainage

Pyrite oxidation by atmospheric  in the presence of moisture initially produces ferrous ions and sulfuric acid which dissociates into sulfate ions and protons, leading to acid mine drainage (AMD). An example of acid rock drainage caused by pyrite is the 2015 Gold King Mine waste water spill.

2FeS2{\scriptstyle (s)} + 7O2{\scriptstyle (g)} + 2H2O{\scriptstyle (l)} -> 2Fe^{2+}{\scriptstyle (aq)} + 4SO4^{2-}{\scriptstyle (aq)} + 4H+{\scriptstyle (aq)}.

Dust explosions
Pyrite oxidation is sufficiently exothermic that underground coal mines in high-sulfur coal seams have occasionally had serious problems with spontaneous combustion. The solution is the use of buffer blasting and the use of various sealing or cladding agents to hermetically seal the mined-out areas to exclude oxygen.

In modern coal mines, limestone dust is sprayed onto the exposed coal surfaces to reduce the hazard of dust explosions. This has the secondary benefit of neutralizing the acid released by pyrite oxidation and therefore slowing the oxidation cycle described above, thus reducing the likelihood of spontaneous combustion. In the long term, however, oxidation continues, and the hydrated sulfates formed may exert crystallization pressure that can expand cracks in the rock and lead eventually to roof fall.

Weakened building materials

Building stone containing pyrite tends to stain brown as pyrite oxidizes. This problem appears to be significantly worse if any marcasite is present. The presence of pyrite in the aggregate used to make concrete can lead to severe deterioration as pyrite oxidizes. In early 2009, problems with Chinese drywall imported into the United States after Hurricane Katrina were attributed to pyrite oxidation, followed by microbial sulfate reduction which released hydrogen sulfide gas. These problems included a foul odor and corrosion of copper wiring. In the United States, in Canada, and more recently in Ireland, where it was used as underfloor infill, pyrite contamination has caused major structural damage. Concrete exposed to sulfate ions, or sulfuric acid, degrades by sulfate attack: the formation of expansive mineral phases, such as ettringite (small needle crystals exerting a huge crystallization pressure inside the concrete pores) and gypsum creates inner tensile forces in the concrete matrix which destroy the hardened cement paste, form cracks and fissures in concrete, and can lead to the ultimate ruin of the structure. Normalized tests for construction aggregate certify such materials as free of pyrite or marcasite.

Occurrence
Pyrite is the most common of sulfide minerals and is widespread in igneous, metamorphic, and sedimentary rocks. It is a common accessory mineral in igneous rocks, where it also occasionally occurs as larger masses arising from an immiscible sulfide phase in the original magma. It is found in metamorphic rocks as a product of contact metamorphism. It also forms as a high-temperature hydrothermal mineral, though it occasionally forms at lower temperatures.
 
Pyrite occurs both as a primary mineral, present in the original sediments, and as a secondary mineral, deposited during diagenesis. Pyrite and marcasite commonly occur as replacement pseudomorphs after fossils in black shale and other sedimentary rocks formed under reducing environmental conditions. Pyrite is common as an accessory mineral in shale, where it is formed by precipitation from anoxic seawater, and coal beds often contain significant pyrite.

Notable deposits are found as lenticular masses in Virginia, U.S., and in smaller quantities in many other locations. Large deposits are mined at Rio Tinto in Spain and elsewhere in the Iberian Peninsula.

Cultural beliefs
In the beliefs of the Thai people (especially the southerner), pyrite is known by multiple names: Khao tok Phra Ruang, Khao khon bat Phra Ruang (ข้าวตอกพระร่วง, ข้าวก้นบาตรพระร่วง) or Phet na tang, Hin na tang (เพชรหน้าทั่ง, หินหน้าทั่ง). It is believed to be a sacred item that has the power to prevent evil, black magic or demons.

Images

See also
 Iron–sulfur world hypothesis
 Sulfur isotope biogeochemistry

References

Further reading
 American Geological Institute, 2003, Dictionary of Mining, Mineral, and Related Terms, 2nd ed., Springer, New York, .
 David Rickard, Pyrite: A Natural History of Fool's Gold, Oxford, New York, 2015, .

External links

 Educational article about the famous pyrite crystals from the Navajun Mine
 How Minerals Form and Change "Pyrite oxidation under room conditions".
 

Disulfides
Firelighting
Pyrite group
Iron(II) minerals
Cubic minerals
Minerals in space group 205
Sulfide minerals
Alchemical substances
Semiconductor materials
Transition metal dichalcogenides